Craig Anderson Blackwood (born 28 May 1956) is a former New Zealand professional squash player.

Early life
Blackwood was born in Whangārei on 28 May 1956 and lived in Auckland. 
He started playing squash at the age of 11 for the Auckland North Shore Club and broke into the world rankings during the 1981/82 season. His sister Robyn Blackwood was a former New Zealand number one player.

Career
Craig represented New Zealand during the 1979 & 1981 World Team Squash Championships.

References

External links
 

New Zealand male squash players
1956 births
Living people
Sportspeople from Whangārei